Edward Alexander Sprinkle (September 3, 1923 – July 28, 2014) was an American professional football player for the Chicago Bears of the National Football League (NFL). He was known to many as "The Meanest Man in Pro Football" and was nicknamed "The Claw." He played for 12 seasons with the Bears and is credited with calling attention to the NFL's defensive players.

College career
Prior to his NFL career, Sprinkle won three letters in football and two in basketball and earned All-Border Conference while at Hardin–Simmons University in the early 1940s.  Hardin-Simmons dropped its sports program due to World War II, causing Sprinkle to transfer to the United States Naval Academy for his senior season in 1943, where he earned All-Eastern honors.

Playing career
After leaving college, Sprinkle was signed by George Halas' Chicago Bears in 1944. At first, he played on both defense and offense; he caught 32 passes for 451 yards and seven touchdowns during his career. His ability to rush opposing quarterbacks, however, soon made him a defensive specialist.

Sprinkle quickly developed a reputation for his aggressive playing style; in the 1946 NFL Championship Game, New York Giants George Franck, Frank Reagan, and Frank Filchock left with injuries sustained in hits from Sprinkle. One of Sprinkle's tackling strategies, a clothesline tackle with his forearm, led to him receiving the nickname "The Claw" from Collier's Weekly.

While accused of "dirty play" and unsportsmanlike conduct during his career, leading to calls in 1949 from coaches Greasy Neale and Buddy Parker for the NFL to discipline him, he defended his play as not being any different from other players of the era. According to Sprinkle, "We were meaner in the 1950s because there were fewer positions and we fought harder for them. It was a different era." He was praised by Halas "the greatest pass-rusher I've ever seen," while Giants quarterback Y. A. Tittle remarked in 1969 that "quarterbacks would look with only one eye for receivers. They kept the other eye on Sprinkle."

Post-playing career
Following his pro career, Sprinkle entered business in the Chicago area. He died on July 28, 2014.

The Professional Football Researchers Association named Sprinkle to the PFRA Hall of Very Good Class of 2007.
Sprinkle was also inducted in the Chicagoland Sports Hall of Fame.

On January 15, 2020, Sprinkle was elected to the Pro Football Hall of Fame Class of 2020.

Sprinkle was also an avid golfer. He had a handicap of 18 at the Midlothian Country Club.

References

External sources

1923 births
2014 deaths
Players of American football from Texas
People from Taylor County, Texas
Hardin–Simmons Cowboys football players
Navy Midshipmen football players
Western Conference Pro Bowl players
Chicago Bears players
Pro Football Hall of Fame inductees
Military personnel from Texas